Zantas Kabini (born 21 February 1985) is a Solomon Islands retired footballer who played as a goalkeeper, and is the goalkeeping coach of the Solomon Islands national football team.

He played 2 international games for the Solomon Islands.

Career statistics

International

References

1985 births
Living people
Solomon Islands footballers
Solomon Islands international footballers
Association football goalkeepers